Maloyeniseyskoye is a rural locality (a selo) and the administrative center of Maloyeniseysky Selsoviet, Biysky District, Altai Krai, Russia. The population was 2,181 as of 2013. There are 20 streets.

Geography 
Maloyeniseyskoye is located 23 km east of Biysk (the district's administrative centre) by road. Yeniseyskoye is the nearest rural locality.

References 

Rural localities in Biysky District